Hanrgram is a village in Bhatar CD block in Bardhaman Sadar North subdivision of Purba Bardhaman district in the state of West Bengal, India with 1,239 families residing.

History
Census 2011 Hanrgram Village Location Code or Village Code 319854. The village of Hanrgram is located in the Bhatar tehsil of Burdwan district in West Bengal, India.

Transport 

Population 
, Schedule Castes (SC) constitute 22.30% of the population, while Schedule Tribe (ST) are 5.21% of the total population in Hanrgram.

Population and house data

Healthcare
Nearest Rural Hospital at Bhatar (with 60 beds) is the main medical facility in Bhatar CD block. There are primary health centres.

References 

Villages in Purba Bardhaman district